LD may refer to:

Arts and entertainment

Film and television
Lorraine "L.D." Delacorte, a character on the TV series Degrassi
Larry David, sometimes referred to as L.D. on the television show Curb Your Enthusiasm
Latin Disciples, a fictional gang in television series Day Break
Living Dangerously, an Extreme Champion Wrestling pay-per-view event (ECW PPV)
Low-definition television (LDTV)
"-LD", a United States call sign suffix signifying a low-power digital television station

Music
Lil Dicky (born 1988), American rapper
Little Doses, a Scottish alternative rock band
Luis Dubuc (born 1985), American musician
LD (rapper), British rapper
Lemon Demon, American musical project and band

Businesses and organizations
Air Hong Kong (IATA code LD)
Light Dragoons, a British Army cavalry regiment
Línea Turística Aereotuy (IATA code LD)
Louis Dreyfus Company, a French commodities trading firm

Economics and finance

Contract law
 Liability damages
 Liquidated damages

Currencies
Liberian dollar, the currency of Liberia
Libyan dinar, the currency of Libya
Liberty dollar (private currency), produced in the US

Places
LD postcode area, also known as the Llandrindod Wells postcode area, in Wales
Lakshadweep, India (ISO 3166-2 code LD)
County Longford, Ireland (code LD)

Politics
Liberal democracy, a form of government based on rule of the people (democracy) tempered by the rule of law and natural rights (liberalism)
Lincoln–Douglas debate, a form of debate
Liberal Democrats (UK), a UK political party
Lord, a peer of the realm in the United Kingdom

Science, technology, and mathematics

Astronomy
Lilian day, a variant of the Julian day
Lunar distance (astronomy), the distance between the Earth and the Moon, used a general measure of distance

Biology and medicine
Lactate dehydrogenase, an enzyme in plants and animals
Lateral dorsal nucleus of thalamus, an anatomic structure of the brain
Lethal dose, an indication of the lethal toxicity of a given substance or type of radiation
 Licensed Dietitian
Linkage disequilibrium, in genetics, when alleles occur together more often than they would by chance

Electronics and computing
ld, an instruction on a Z80 CPU
ld (Unix), the linker command on Unix and Unix-like systems
Laser diode, semiconductor laser-emitting device 
LaserDisc, an obsolete optical disc video/data format and predecessor to DVD
Levenshtein distance, a string metric for measuring the difference between two sequences.
Line Dubbed, a term for unlicensed copies of films with an audio track, which has been ripped from the line out connection of a projector
Linked data, a method of publishing structured data so that it can be interlinked and become more useful

Telecommunications
Long-distance calling, a telephone call charged at a higher rate
Loop Disconnect dialing

Other
Ladder diagram (disambiguation), with various meanings
D/L nomenclature, used in naming chemical compounds
 Linz-Donawitz process, a widely-used process in Basic oxygen steelmaking
Listening device, used in covert investigations
Binary logarithm, from the Latin logarithmus dualis
London dispersion force, weak intermolecular forces
Laser designator, used by the military for targeting
Language Development, the changes that take place in language,speech & communication in the context of children's development

Other uses
LD (cigarette), a brand of cigarette
Learning disability, a condition that can impair learning through standard methods
Lighting designer, a person in charge of lighting in theatre
Lincoln–Douglas debate format
Line Drive, in baseball
Long-distance relationship
Lucid dreaming, a dream in which one is conscious of dreaming as it is happening
Ludum Dare, a game development competition

See also
eLDee, Nigerian rapper and record producer
1D (disambiguation), similar in glyphic structure to "lD"/"ld"(1d)
ID (disambiguation), similar in glyphic structure to "lD"/"ld"(Id)